State Highway 179 (SH 179) is a short Texas state highway, traveling  between Teague and Dew. The route was designated on October 26, 1932, along its current route.

Route description
SH 179 begins in Teague at Business US 84. The route continues as Main Street through low-density residential development before meeting FM 553 at the latter's southern terminus. Leaving Teague, SH 179 travels eastward through a rural area until reaching Dew. Upon entering Dew, the highway meets I-45 at an interchange flanked by commercial development. SH 179 then passes by a school before reaching its eastern terminus at FM 489, which provides access to SH 75.

History
SH 179 was designated on October 26, 1932, from Teague to SH 32 (now SH 75). The route has since been truncated slightly to FM 489.

Junction list

References

179
Transportation in Freestone County, Texas